Chetopa is a city in Labette County, Kansas, United States.  As of the 2020 census, the population of the city was 929.  Chetopa was named for Chief Chetopah, an Osage Indian chief. Later, the community name was shortened.

History
The community began as an Osage village, named after its Chief Chetopah, whose name in the Osage language signifies "four lodges," was an advocate of peace, the leading chief of the Little Osage tribe, and one of the chief counselors of the Osage Nation.

In 1847 a trading post to exchange goods with the Osage Nation was established here by Larkin McGhee.  By the time of McGhee's arrival there were three other Euro-American families plus two families with a Euro-American husband and a Cherokee wife at Chetopa.  There were also many Osage there.

Chetopa was the site of a September 18, 1861 battle between the 6th Kansas Cavalry under the direction of James G. Blunt and pro-slavery raiders led by John Allan Mathews, whose wife was an Osage and was culturally identified with the Osages.

The first post office in Chetopa was established in April 1867.  In 1880, Postmaster J.M. Cavaness petitioned the removal of the ending “h” in the original spelling to become Chetopa.

Chetopa was the destination of the Nevada and Minden Railway, completed in 1886.  The town attracted that line, which ran southwest from Nevada, Missouri through Pittsburg, Kansas, when it donated land for right-of-way and year/depot purposes.  Much of the trackage has since been abandoned.

Geography
Chetopa is located at  (37.037452, -95.091892).

Climate
The climate in this area is characterized by hot, humid summers and generally mild to cool winters.  According to the Köppen Climate Classification system, Chetopa has a humid subtropical climate, abbreviated "Cfa" on climate maps.

Demographics

2010 census
As of the census of 2010, there were 1,125 people, 493 households, and 292 families residing in the city. The racial makeup of the city was 85.4% White, 2.1% African American, 6.0% Native American, 0.3% Asian, 1.0% from other races, and 5.2% from two or more races. Hispanic or Latino of any race were 3.2% of the population.

There were 493 households, of which 25.2% had children under the age of 18 living with them, 42.8% were married couples living together, 11.2% had a female householder with no husband present, 5.3% had a male householder with no wife present, and 40.8% were non-families. 36.3% of all households were made up of individuals, and 18.5% had someone living alone who was 65 years of age or older. The average household size was 2.22 and the average family size was 2.87.

The median age in the city was 46.9 years. 20.3% of residents were under the age of 18; 8.4% were between the ages of 18 and 24; 19.1% were from 25 to 44; 29.3% were from 45 to 64; and 22.9% were 65 years of age or older. The gender makeup of the city was 49.3% male and 50.7% female.

2000 census
As of the census of 2000, there were 1,281 people, 560 households, and 341 families residing in the city. The racial makeup of the city was 89.15% White, 2.26% African American, 6.32% Native American, 0.08% from other races, and 2.19% from two or more races. Hispanic or Latino of any race were 1.01% of the population.

There were 560 households, out of which 24.8% had children under the age of 18 living with them, 46.1% were married couples living together, 9.6% had a female householder with no husband present, and 39.1% were non-families. 35.7% of all households were made up of individuals, and 19.6% had someone living alone who was 65 years of age or older. The average household size was 2.22 and the average family size was 2.85.

In the city, the population was spread out, with 22.3% under the age of 18, 7.2% from 18 to 24, 22.6% from 25 to 44, 24.2% from 45 to 64, and 23.7% who were 65 years of age or older. The median age was 44 years. For every 100 females, there were 90.6 males. For every 100 females age 18 and over, there were 86.3 males.

As of 2000 the median income for a household in the city was $23,250, and the median income for a family was $29,338. Males had a median income of $24,479 versus $19,231 for females. The per capita income for the city was $11,705. About 13.1% of families and 18.8% of the population were below the poverty line, including 29.3% of those under age 18 and 15.7% of those age 65 or over.

Education
Chetopa is served by three Chetopa–St. Paul USD 505 public schools:
 Chetopa Elementary School
 Chetopa Junior High School
 Chetopa High School

Chetopa is also served by a public library and a historic preservation society.  The Chetopa Public Library is located at 312 Maple Street. The Historical Preservation Society of Labette County has a mission to preserve historical locales in Labette County for posterity.

See also
 Great Flood of 1951

References

Further reading

External links
 City of Chetopa
 Chetopa - Directory of Public Officials
 Chetopa city map, KDOT

Cities in Kansas
Cities in Labette County, Kansas
1857 establishments in Kansas Territory